The Czech Social Democratic Party (ČSSD) leadership election of 2006 was held on 13 May 2006. Czech Prime Minister and Jiří Paroubek was elected new leader of the party. Paroubek stated that he feels obliged by the result and that he plans to win next legislative election.

References

Czech Social Democratic Party leadership elections
Social Democratic Party leadership election
Social Democratic Party leadership election
Indirect elections
Single-candidate elections
Czech Social Democratic Party leadership election
Czech Social Democratic Party leadership election